Paul Hanley and Todd Woodbridge were the defending champions, but Woodbridge did not participate this year.  Hanley partnered Brian MacPhie, losing in the quarterfinals.

Jonathan Erlich and Andy Ram won the title, defeating Simon Aspelin and Todd Perry 4–6, 6–3, 7–5 in the final.

Seeds

  Simon Aspelin /  Todd Perry (final)
  Jonathan Erlich /  Andy Ram (champions)
  Graydon Oliver /  Jared Palmer (semifinals)
  Paul Hanley /  Brian MacPhie (quarterfinals)

Draw

Draw

External links
 Draw

Nottingham Open
2005 ATP Tour
2005 Nottingham Open